The New York World was one of the first newspapers to publish comic strips, starting around 1890, and contributed greatly to the development of the American comic strip. Notable strips that originated with the World included Richard F. Outcault's Hogan's Alley, Rudolph Dirks' The Captain and the Kids, Denys Wortman's Everyday Movies, Fritzi Ritz, Gus Mager's Hawkshaw the Detective, Victor Forsythe's Joe Jinks, and Robert Moore Brinkerhoff's Little Mary Mixup.

Under the names World Feature Service and New York World Press Publishing  the company also syndicated comic strips to other newspapers around the country from circa 1905 until the paper's demise in 1931.

History 
Joseph Pulitzer's New York World newspaper began publishing cartoons in 1889. A color Sunday humor supplement began to run in the World in Spring 1893. In 1894, the World published the first color strip, designed by Walt McDougall, showing that the technique already enabled this kind of publication. The supplement's editor Morrill Goddard contacted cartoonist Richard F. Outcault and offered Outcault a full-time position with the World. Outcault's Yellow Kid character  made his debut in the World on January 13, 1895.  The kid appeared in color for the first time in the May 5 issue in a cartoon titled "At the Circus in Hogan's Alley".  Outcault weekly Hogan's Alley cartoons appeared from then on in color, starring rambunctious slum kids in the streets, in particular, the bald kid, who gained the name Mickey Dugan. The strip's popularity drove up the Worlds circulation and the Kid was widely merchandised. Outcault — and much of the World's Sunday supplement staff — left for William Randolph Hearst's New York Journal on October 18, 1896. George Luks took over with his own version of Hogan's Alley; but the Yellow Kid's popularity soon faded, and Luks' version ended in December 1897.

After Hogan's Alley, the World published a number of comic strips from the late 1890s until the paper's 1931 demise. The prolific cartoonist C. W. Kahles was responsible for numerous comic strips for the World. He is credited as the pioneer of daily comic strip continuity with his Clarence the Cop, which he drew for the World beginning in the latter 1890s. It introduced to newspapers the innovation of continuing a comic strip story in a day-to-day serial format, and is also considered to be the first police strip. Kahles' Sandy Highflyer, the Airship Man (1902–1904) is considered the first aviation comic strip. The cartoonist and comics historian Ernest McGee called Kahles the "hardest working cartoonist in history, having as many as eight Sunday comics running at one time (1905-1906) with no assistants to help him."

Clare Victor Dwiggins joined the World in 1897. He created a wide variety of gag panels. In 1904, after winning $3,000 at the racetrack, cartoonist George McManus went to New York City and a job with the World, where he worked on several short-lived comic strips. One of them, The Newlyweds (later renamed Their Only Child) is considered one of the first comic strips to depict the lives of the typical American family.
 Little Mary Mixup (launched 1917; moved to United Features in 1931 where in ran until 1956)
 Jack Callahan:
 Flivvers (1916–1917) 
 Midweek Movies (1910–1919)
 Bill and the Jones Boys (1905) — Sunday strip
 Buddy's Baby Sister (1913) — Sunday strip
 Dearie  (1910) — Sunday strip
 Duddy's Baby Sister (1913) — Sunday strip 
 Everyday Movies (1921–1924;  strip taken over by Denys Wortman) — gag panel
 Home Sweet Home (1907–1908) — Sunday strip 
 Kitty Kildare (1921)
 Lady Bountiful (1903–1905, 1915–1918) — came over from the Hearst Syndicate, where it had been launched in 1902
 Little Darling (1920–1921)
 Major Stuff (1914–1915) — Sunday strip 
 Mr. Al Most (1911-1912) — Sunday strip
 Pansy's Pal (1920)
 Phyllis (1903-1906) — Sunday strip
 Poor Mr. W (1917–1920)
 The Prodigal Son (1906–1907) — Sunday strip 
 Reddy and Caruso (1907) — Sunday strip 
 Romeo (1905-1907) — Sunday strip 
 Step-Brothers (1907-1914) — Sunday strip
 Harry Grant Dart:
 Boys Will Be Boys (1909)
 The Explorigator (1908)
 Life and Judge (1910s – 1920s)
 William Wallace Denslow:
 Billy Bounce (1901-1905, 1908-1911) originally by Denslow, then by C. W. Kahles
 Rudolph Dirks:
 The Captain and the Kids (launched 1914; moved to United Features in 1931 where in ran until 1979)
 Clare Victor Dwiggins:

 J. Filliken Wilberfloss
 Leap Year Lizzie, Ain't She Bizzy? (1912)
 Makin' Believe (1912–1913)
 Babbling Brooks (1922–1923, 1930–1931)
 Banana Oil (1923–1927; later known as Gross Exaggerations, The Feitelbaum Family, and Looy Dot Dope; lasted until at least 1930)
 Bimbo (1922)
 Count Screwloose of Tooloose (1929-1930;  moved to King Features Syndicate, where it ran until 1945)
 Hitz and Mrs. (1923)
 Looy Dot Dope (1926–1938) originally by Gross, later by Bernard Dibble and John Devlin
 Gus Jud:
 Little Dave (1930–1932) — Sunday strip
 Main Street (launched 1928)
 George McManus:
 Cheerful Charlie (launched c. 1904–c. 1916) — later taken over by Harry Grant Dart
 Let George Do It (later known as Let Bill Do It) (1910–1911) — later made into a Broadway musical
 The Merry Marcelene
 The Newlyweds (later renamed Their Only Child) (1904–1912; moved to the New York American where it ended in 1916)
 Nibsby the Newsboy in Funny Fairyland (1906)
 Panhandle Pete (1908)
 Ready Money Ladies
 Snoozer
 Otto Messmer:
 Fun
 Art Nugent:
 Puzzlers (1927–c. 1931)
 Richard F. Outcault
  Casey’s Corner (launched February 13, 1898; and moved to the New York Evening Journal on April 8, 1898) —  one of the first newspaper strips to feature continuity
 Hogan's Alley (1895–1897)
 C. M. Payne:
 Little Sammy (1914–1915)
 H. T. Webster:
 The Man in the Brown Derby (1924–1925)
 The Timid Soul (c. 1925–1931; moved to the New York Herald Tribune Syndicate, where it lasted until 1953) — evolved out of The Man in the Brown Derby
 Larry Whittington:
 Fritzi Ritz, originally by Whittington; later by Ernie Bushmiller (launched 1922; moved to United Features in 1931 where it ran until 1968)
 Denys Wortman:
 Everyday Movies (also known as Metropolitan Movies) (taken over from Gene Carr in 1924; moved to United Features in 1931, where it ran until 1954) — gag panel

References 

New York World
Comic strip syndicates
Lists of comic strips